The  Detroit Lions season was the franchise's 62nd season in the National Football League, their 58th as the Detroit Lions. It stands as the team's best season since the NFL-AFL merger in 1970.

The team finished 12-4, won the NFC Central Division, and appeared in the playoffs for the first time since 1983; it also marked the team's first winning season since 1983. The Lions finished the season undefeated in the Pontiac Silverdome, including playoffs, and the team did not lose a game at an indoor facility the entire season, having made trips to Indianapolis and Minnesota during the year.

This season also saw the Lions debut of wide receiver Herman Moore, the team's 1991 first round draft pick who went on to set records as part of an explosive passing offense later in the decade.

The 1991 season was the last season that saw the Lions sweep the Green Bay Packers until 2017 and was also the last time the Lions would win at Lambeau Field until 2015.

As of 2022, this season is also the last where the Lions won a playoff game.

The season
Statistics site Football Outsiders summed up Detroit's season thus: "The Lions were one of the most inconsistent teams of the year, which is what happens when you win 12 games but lose 45–0 (to Washington) and 35–3 (to San Francisco). Otherwise, it's a little hard to tell why they ended up only 17th in [efficiency]. The Lions didn't have too many super-close victories, but did go 4–0 in games decided by a touchdown or less. They didn't particularly take advantage of long plays ... with only four gains of 50 yards or more. They did benefit a little extra from fumbles on defense, recovering 15 of 23. They also benefitted from poor opponent special teams...."

Detroit, according to Football Outsiders, had "a bit of an odd schedule; on the surface, it doesn't look like Detroit's schedule of opposing run defenses was that easy. The Lions missed the [league-leading] Eagles, but they did have to play six games against the teams ranked sixth through ninth in run defense [efficiency]: San Francisco, Chicago, Washington, and Green Bay. Except running back Barry Sanders didn't play against Washington in Week 1, and he had only seven carries against San Francisco in Week 8. His two highest-carry games came against the two worst run defenses in the league, Miami and Indianapolis."

Season summary
The Lions were plagued by injuries most of the season.  Wide receiver Aubrey Matthews was lost for the season to a knee injury on a meaningless final play during a 45-0 loss to the Washington Redskins during Week 1.  Starting quarterback Rodney Peete was lost for the season in the 9th game of the year, a 34–10 victory over the Dallas Cowboys. Second string quarterback Erik Kramer, who had won the backup quarterback job from Andre Ware (the team's #1 draft pick from the season before) during training camp, guided the team the rest of the way. Although Peete's injury was serious, the most devastating injury was the career-ending injury that befell guard Mike Utley in a Week 12 game against the Los Angeles Rams. Utley suffered a severe injury to two of his cervical vertebrae, rendering him paralyzed from the chest down and ending his career. Unaware of this, Utley gave a thumbs-up gesture to the crowd as he was being wheeled from the field. For the rest of the season, Lions players wore a decal with Utley's number 60 on their helmets to honor their fallen teammate.

Utley's injury gave inspiration to a team that at that point in the season was struggling, and the team won its last six games to steal the division title away from the Chicago Bears, whose Week 17 loss to the San Francisco 49ers sealed their first division title since 1983. The Lions earned a bye into the divisional round where they once again faced the Cowboys, who had beaten the Bears the week before to get their first playoff win since 1982. The two teams met in the postseason for the first time since 1970 when Dallas won 5-0.

Although the Cowboys held Lions' star running back Barry Sanders in check for most of the game, Kramer threw for 341 yards and three touchdowns and Sanders closed the scoring with an electrifying 47-yard touchdown run for a 38–6 victory.  It was the Lions' first—and, to date, only—postseason victory since they won their last league championship in 1957.

The win earned the Lions a return trip to Washington for the NFC Championship Game and a chance to avenge the 45–0 defeat in the season opener. The Redskins jumped to an early 10–0 lead when Kramer was sacked and fumbled on the Lions' first possession, then was intercepted on the second. The Lions fought back with a touchdown pass to receiver Willie Green and a field goal by kicker Eddie Murray in the second quarter to stay within one score at the half. The Lions trailed 17–10 at the break, but failed to score again as Washington scored 24 points in the second half to put the game away. Ware replaced Kramer as quarterback in the fourth quarter. He promptly threw an interception which was returned by Darrell Green for the game's final touchdown.  The 1991 Lions' season thus ended the way it started, with a loss to the Redskins at RFK Stadium; getting outscored 86-10 in the two games.

The Lions finished the season with a 9–0 record at home, counting their playoff win. The team did not play particularly well on the road: outside of their wins at Indianapolis and Minnesota, their only other outdoor wins came against the Green Bay Packers in Week 16, and the eventual AFC Champion Buffalo Bills in Week 17; the margin of victory in those games were four and three points respectively and the Lions gave up 30 or more points in three of their four road losses, two of which came to teams that failed to qualify for the playoffs (San Francisco 49ers, Tampa Bay Buccaneers).

The Lions road win against the Packers in Week 16 of the season stood as their last until 2015, the Lions owned a 25-game road losing streak in Wisconsin.

Offseason

NFL Draft

Personnel

Staff

Roster

Regular season

Schedule

Game summaries

Week 1: at Washington Redskins

Week 2: vs. Green Bay Packers

Week 3: vs. Miami Dolphins

Week 4: at Indianapolis Colts

Week 5: vs. Tampa Bay Buccaneers

Week 6: vs. Minnesota Vikings

Week 8: at San Francisco 49ers

Week 9: vs. Dallas Cowboys

Week 10: at Chicago Bears

Week 11: at Tampa Bay Buccaneers

Week 12: vs. Los Angeles Rams

This was the game that Lions guard Mike Utley suffered a career ending spinal injury. While he was carted off the field, he gives the Lions a "thumbs up".

Week 13: at Minnesota Vikings

Week 14: vs. Chicago Bears

Week 15: vs. New York Jets

Week 16: at Green Bay Packers

Erik Kramer led the Detroit Lions to victory with 2 touchdown passes and no turnovers. This was the last time the Lions won in Wisconsin until 2015.

Week 17: at Buffalo Bills

Standings

Playoffs

NFC Divisional Playoffs: vs. (5) Dallas Cowboys

The Lions entered the 1991-92 NFL playoffs as the NFC's 2 seed behind the #1 seed Washington Redskins. Following wild card weekend where both the home teams lost to the away teams (Chicago to Dallas and New Orleans to Atlanta) the Cowboys were the highest remaining seed and thus earned a trip to Pontiac, Michigan to play the Lions. Dallas entered the game with an ongoing quarterback controversy. Incumbent Troy Aikman had gone down with injury earlier in the season. The backup Steve Beuerlein came in and lead the team to the playoffs. Beuerlein had started in the wild card win over Chicago and the Cowboys head coach Jimmy Johnson named him the starter for this game as well. As for the Lions they had to battle quarterback issues of their own. Rodney Peete, Andre Ware, and Erik Kramer all spent time as the Lions quarterback. After Peete went down it was Kramer who emerged as the starter and would start this playoff game as well. Despite not having a franchise quarterback the Lions had a lot to feel good about going into this game. Star running back Barry Sanders, Herman Moore, Brett Perriman, Lomas Brown and Kevin Glover gave them plenty of talent on offense while Chris Spielman, Ray Crockett and Bennie Blades were the stars on defense. The most exciting storyline going into the game was Barry Sanders going up against Cowboys running back Emmitt Smith.

From the very beginning of the game the Lions were dominant. Since the team knew Dallas would focus on stopping Barry Sanders and the run game, Detroit gambled by focusing on Erik Kramer and the pass game instead. Dallas was not ready to defend it. After the Cowboys went 3 and out on their first drive, Kramer drove the Lions downfield and scored on a touchdown pass to Willie Green to take a 7-0 lead. Detroit would never relinquish it. Despite the Lions only putting up another 10 points before halftime, Dallas's offense couldn't find the end zone and only scored two field goals before the end of the second giving Detroit an 11-point lead at halftime and thus Beuerlein's day was over. Johnson inserted Aikman into the game but he wasn't able to pick apart Detroit's defense either and wouldn't even score any points while the Lions continued to steamroll Dallas. Even with the lead Detroit kept allowing Kramer to throw instead of turning to Sanders and it paid off as he completed 29 out of 38 passes for 341 yards and 3 touchdowns helping Detroit to a 38-6 victory. This was the Lions' only playoff win of the Barry Sanders era and as of 2022, the only playoff victory in the Super Bowl era.

NFC Championship: at (1) Washington Redskins

The Redskins crushed the Lions, 41–10, as quarterback Mark Rypien completed 12 out of 17 passes for 228 yards and 2 touchdowns. Detroit quarterback Erik Kramer was sacked 5 times, three of them by Washington linebacker Wilber Marshall. Lions running back Barry Sanders, who rushed for 1,548 yards during the season, was held to just 44 yards on 11 carries. As of 2022, this was the first and only time that the Lions made an appearance in the NFC Championship Game.

Awards and honors
Mel Gray, NFL Kickoff Return Leader
 Mel Gray, All Pro
 Barry Sanders, All-Pro
 Barry Sanders, NFC Pro Bowl Selection
 Barry Sanders, Bert Bell Award
 Lomas Brown, Pro Bowl Selection
 Lomas Brown, All Pro
 Jerry Ball, Pro Bowl Selection
 Jerry Ball, All Pro
 Chis Spielman, Pro Bowl Selection
 Chris Spielman, All Pro
 Bennie Blades, Pro Bowl Selection
 Bennie Blades, All Pro

References

External links
 1991 Detroit Lions at Pro-Football-Reference.com

Detroit
Detroit Lions seasons
NFC Central championship seasons
Detroit Lions